Adélaïde-Louise d'Eckmühl de Blocqueville (8 July 1815 – 6 October 1892), was a French woman of letters and a poet. The last daughter of Louis Nicolas Davout, she devoted a large part of her life to honouring the memory of the "glorious marshal" of Napoléon.

Life 
Born in Paris, in 1835, Davout married a Maréchal de camp twenty-six years older than her, Edmond François de Coulibœuf, marquis de Blocqueville. She shone at the court of king Louis Philippe and attracted queen Maria-Amalia's affectionate friendship. She published her first novel, Perdita, in 1859. Becoming a widow in 1861, she held a salon in her Parisian hotel where many personalities from the political, artistic and literary worlds met, including Dominique Ingres, Adolphe Thiers, Henri Lacordaire, Octave Feuillet, Elme-Marie Caro, Charles Ernest Beulé, Victor Cousin, Franz Liszt. In 1869, the latter composed a musical portrait in honour of the Marquise. One of the most frequent visitors was Jules Claretie, who wrote:

In 1874, the marquise published Les Soirées de la villa des Jasmins, where she portrayed four friends "who talked about the soul and its destinies, the unfathomable mysteries of the human heart and discussed a thousand different questions of philosophy, literature and art"; we find there, wrote the critic of the Journal des Savants, "in the midst of many longueurs, many generous ideas, noble impulses, fine observations, right and elevated thoughts".

From 1879 onwards, she published several volumes dedicated to her father's memory as well as several collections of poetry. At the Academie des jeux floraux, which conferred on her the title of "Master of Games" in 1878, she established the Eckmühl Prize in 1880, a biennial competition that rewards the best essay on a subject of Christian philosophy with a golden jasmine. She then founded a museum, the Salle d'Eckmühl in Auxerre, to which she donated many family souvenirs. In 1885, she bequeathed by will the sum of 300,000 francs for the construction of the famous phare d'Eckmühl at Penmarc'h.

After she died in Villers-sur-Mer, she was buried at the Père Lachaise Cemetery (28th division).

Works 
Perdita (1859) Read on line on Gallica
Chrétienne et musulman (1861). Reissued in 1892 under the title Stella et Mohammed, ou Chrétienne et musulman. Read on line (Gallica)
Le Prisme de l'âme, étude (1863)
Rome (1865) Text on line on Gallica
Les Soirées de la villa des Jasmins (4 volumes, 1874)
Le Maréchal Davout, prince d'Eckmühl, raconté par les siens et par lui-même (4 volumes, 1879-1880)
Roses de Noël. Pensées d'hiver (1884)
Pensées d'un pape (Clement XIV), publiées par la Mise de Blocqueville (1885)
A.-L. d'Eckmühl, Mise de Blocqueville. Le maréchal Davout, prince d'Eckmühl. Correspondance inédite, 1790-1815. Pologne, Russie, Hambourg (1887) Read on line on Gallica
Chrysanthèmes, pensées d'automne (1888)
À travers l'Invisible (1891)
Pensées et souvenirs (1894)
Un prêté rendu, proverbe (s.d.)

References

Sources

External links 

 Complete will of the Marquise
 Le phare d'AdélaIde-Louise d'Eckmühl de Bloqueville

1815 births
1892 deaths
Writers from Paris
19th-century French poets
French women poets
French salon-holders
Burials at Père Lachaise Cemetery
19th-century French women writers
Museum founders
19th-century French philanthropists